Jacques Champion (4 September 1934 – 21 August 1990) was a French racing cyclist. He rode in the 1959 Tour de France.

References

1934 births
1990 deaths
French male cyclists
Place of birth missing